The Bolshoi Zlatoust (Большой Златоуст) is a -high bell tower that used to dominate the skyline of Yekaterinburg before the Russian Revolution. It was the tallest building in the Urals region. It was destroyed in 1930 and rebuilt 80 years later.

The name translates as "Great (or Big) Chrysostom", a reference to the Orthodox church in the name of St. John Chrysostom, who was (and is), along with St. Basil the Great and St. Gregory of Nazianzus, one of the most honoured Holy Fathers in Russia. This church occupied the place during the early 19th century. The bell tower was designed in 1847 by Vasily Morgan in a Russo-Byzantine style derived from Konstantin Thon's works. It required almost 30 years to build. The church in the ground floor was dedicated to St. Maximian, one of the Seven Sleepers and the patron saint of the Czar's son-in-law, Maximilian de Beauharnais, 3rd Duke of Leuchtenberg.

After the Russian Revolution the church of St. Maximian was closed for worship and eventually dismantled (in 1930) to make way for a statue of Lenin and Stalin. The church was rebuilt in the early 21st century. The builders relied on old photographs and descriptions.

References 

Churches completed in 1876
Towers completed in 1876
19th-century Eastern Orthodox church buildings
Rebuilt churches in Russia
Christian bell towers
Towers in Russia
Russian Orthodox church buildings in Russia
Buildings and structures in Yekaterinburg